Snow is precipitation in the form of crystalline water ice.

Snow may also refer to:

Places
Snow, Kentucky, an unincorporated community in the United States
Snow, Oklahoma, an unincorporated community in the United States
Snow Lake (disambiguation)
Snow Mountain (disambiguation), various mountains in the United States
Snow Peak (disambiguation)
Mount Snow, a ski area in the U.S. state of Vermont
Snow Island (South Shetland Islands), Antarctica

People
Snow (surname), a list of people with the surname Snow or Snowe
Arthur Owens (1899–1957), British WWII double agent codenamed SNOW
Snow (musician) (born 1969), real name Darrin O'Brien, Canadian reggae musician
Snow (Japanese singer) (born 1985), Japanese pop singer
Snow Badua (born 1977), real name Edmund Pineda Badua, Filipino sports journalist
Snow Bowman (1915–1992), real name Albert William Bowman, rugby union player from New Zealand
Snow P. Freeman (1805–1862), Canadian lawyer and political figure from Nova Scotia
Snow Parker (1760–1843), Canadian merchant, judge, and political figure from Nova Scotia
Snow Pendleton (1818–1888), real name Frederick Henry Snow Pendleton, Victorian Era priest in the Church of England
Snow Urbin, real name Snejana Urbin, Russian female dancer and choreographer

Films
Snow (1963 film), a UK documentary short by Geoffrey Jones
Snow: The Movie, a 1982 Australian comedy
Snow (2004 film), a Christmas-themed American television film
Snow (2008 film), a Bosnian film by Aida Begić
Snow (2015 film), a Bulgarian film

Literature
Snow (comics), a 2006 English-language manga by Morgan Luthi
Snow (picture book), a 1998 picture book by Uri Shulevitz
Snow (poem), a 1936 poem by Mao Zedong
Snow (Malfi novel), a 2010 novel by Ronald Malfi
Snow (Pamuk novel), a 2002 novel by Orhan Pamuk
The Snow (novel), a 2004 science fiction novel by Adam Roberts
"Snow" (Beattie short story), a 1986 story by Ann Beattie
"Snow" (Butler short story), a 1991 story by Robert Olen Butler
"Snow" (Crowley short story), a 1985 story by John Crowley

Music

Bands
The Snow (band), a New York rock band
Snowing (band), an American emo band

Albums
Snow (Angus & Julia Stone album) or title (see below; 2017)
Snow (Curt Kirkwood album) or title (2005)
Snow (The New Year album) or title (2017)
Snow (Spock's Beard album) (2002)
Snow (EP), a 1993 EP by the Cocteau Twins

Songs and compositions
"Snow" (Angus & Julia Stone song), the title song of the album Snow, 2017
"Snow (Hey Oh)", a 2006 song by the Red Hot Chili Peppers
"The Snow" (song), a 1991 song by Coil
"Snow", a song by JJ72 from the album, JJ72
"Snow", a song written by Irving Berlin that appears on the soundtrack of the 1954 film, White Christmas
"Snow", a classical song composed by Ivor Gurney
"The Snow", an 1894 part-song composed by Edward Elgar

Video games
Snow (visual novel), a 2003 Japanese adult visual novel
Snow (2019 video game), a 2019 skiing and snowboarding video game

Characters 
Chrissy Snow, a female character on the TV show Three's Company, played by Suzanne Somers
Snow, a gang member in the 1979 film The Warriors
Mr. Snow, a character and the protagonist of the children's book series by Roger Hargreaves, Mr. Men
President Coriolanus Snow, a character in The Hunger Games trilogy and related media
Princess Snow, a character in the manga MÄR
Jon Snow (character), a character in the novel series A Song of Ice and Fire by George R. R. Martin, and in the adapted TV series Game of Thrones
Snow Villiers, one of the male protagonists of the video game, Final Fantasy XIII
Marion Snow, a character in the 2012 sci-fi/action film Lockout

Other uses
SNOW, a stream cipher
Snow (app), an image messaging and multimedia mobile application
Snow (beer), a brand of beer in China
Snow (dessert), two types of dessert
Snow (ship), a type of two-masted sailing vessel
Snow, a codec originating from the FFmpeg project
Snow College, Ephraim, Utah, U.S.
Snowflake Inc., an American cloud computing provider with stock ticker SNOW

Other common meanings 
Cocaine, a narcotic also known as snow
Noise (video) or snow, white noise on an analog video or television display

See also 

Thundersnow
Snowball (disambiguation)
Snowfall (disambiguation)
Snowflake (disambiguation)
Snowstorm (disambiguation)
Big Snow (disambiguation)